Thomas Moon (2 January 1900 – 19 January 1981) was an English professional footballer who played in the Football League playing for Preston North End, Southport, Bradford City and Wigan Borough. He played as an outside right.

Playing career
Moon was born in Preston, Lancashire. He made his debut in the Football League with Southport. He was a nomadic player, representing a number of football league and non-league clubs. He returned many times to Dick, Kerr's football team during his career.

He joined Bradford City from Dick, Kerr's in September 1928. He made 47 league appearances for the club, scoring 17 goals, and also made 4 FA Cup appearances. He left the club in September 1929 to re-join Dick, Kerr's.

He began the 1931–32 season with Wigan Borough. After twelve matches, the club folded and its results were expunged from official records. Moon had played in ten of the league appearances, scoring once. Moon resumed his football career back in non-league with Frickley Colliery and had a spell in Ireland with Drumcondra before retiring.

Notes
 Wigan Borough folded during the 1931–32 season following the match on 24 October 1931, a 5–0 defeat at Wrexham in which Oakes played.

Sources

References

1900 births
1981 deaths
Footballers from Preston, Lancashire
English footballers
Association football forwards
Dick, Kerr's F.C. players
Leigh Genesis F.C. players
Preston North End F.C. players
Southport F.C. players
Chorley F.C. players
Bradford City A.F.C. players
Barrow A.F.C. players
Wigan Borough F.C. players
Frickley Athletic F.C. players
Drumcondra F.C. players
English Football League players